Adelbert William "Al" Putnam (9 October 1908 Salt Lake City, Utah – 15 September 1946 Indianapolis, Indiana) was an American racecar driver. Putnam was killed during qualifying for the first dirt-car race to be held at the Indiana State Fair.

Indianapolis 500 results

References

1908 births
1946 deaths
People from Tulare, California
American racing drivers
Indianapolis 500 drivers
Racing drivers from California
Racing drivers who died while racing
Sports deaths in Indiana